Edwin Creek is a stream in Alberta, Canada.

Edwin Creek has the name of Edwin Gay, a surveyor.

See also
List of rivers of Alberta

References

Rivers of Alberta